Avraham Palman was an Israeli footballer, who played for Hapoel Tel Aviv and Israel.

Biography
Palman started playing football at the age of 10 within the HaNoar HaOved VeHaLomed, before moving to Hapoel Tel Aviv's youth team. In 1937 Palman joined Hapoel HaDarom Tel Aviv, a farm team of Hapoel Tel Aviv. With Hapoel HaDarom, Palman played in the 1937 cup final, where his team lost to Hapoel Tel Aviv. A year later Palman was promoted to the senior Hapoel team, where he played as winger until he switched positions to defender in 1941. With Hapoel Tel Aviv, Palman won 2 championships and 2 cups. In 1954, Palman retired from active play,  Staying with Hapoel Tel Aviv and was in charge of renovating of Basa Stadium, as well as acting as referee from time to time.

Honours
League Championships (2):
 1939–40, 1943–44, 1944–45 (joint championship)
Cup (5):
1938, 1939, 1944

External links
Palman Avraham Hapoel Wiki 
Avraham (Buchka) Palman or: 25 Years Following Football Yechiel Arazi, 10 October 1954, Hadshot HaSport (page 6), via archive.football.org.il

References

1919 births
2000 deaths
20th-century Israeli Jews
Polish emigrants to Mandatory Palestine
Jews in Mandatory Palestine
Israeli footballers
Hapoel Tel Aviv F.C. players
Association football defenders